The World Team Cup was the international men's team championship of the Association of Tennis Professionals (ATP). The inaugural edition of the tournament was contested in 1975 in Kingston, Jamaica and was called the Nations Cup. No tournament was held in 1976 and 1977. From 1978 through 2012 the tournament was held annually in Düsseldorf, Germany. It was generally considered to be second most prestigious men's team competition in tennis after the Davis Cup.

Every year, the eight nations whose top two male players have achieved the highest combined placings in the men's world rankings at the end of the previous year were invited to compete for the cup.

The competition was played on clay courts in Düsseldorf, Germany. The event was generally regarded as the sports highlight of the social scene in the Düsseldorf area. It attracted around 75,000 visitors every year and was televised to over 160 countries.

From 1978 to 1981 the tournament was held under the name "Ambre Solaire Nations Cup", from 1982 until 1986 it was named "Ambre Solaire World Team Cup", from 1987–1999 "Peugeot World Team Cup" and from 2000 the event's main sponsor until 2010 was the ARAG Insurance Group, and its sponsored name was the "ARAG World Team Cup".

After ARAG discontinued sponsorship for the event and organizers failed to find a new sponsor, the 2011 edition of the tournament was initially cancelled. However, a new sponsor — Power Horse — was found in January 2011 and the 2011 edition took place between May 15–21 under the name  "Power Horse World Team Cup".

In October 2012 it was announced that the World Team Cup event would be discontinued and replaced by the Power Horse Cup, an ATP 250 tournament in Düsseldorf.

In September 2017 it was announced that there were plans to revive the tournament: the ATP had proposed a 24 team tournament to be played over 10 days at venues around Australia in January, which would offer 1000 ranking points to any player who won all their matches. 

In January 2018 it was mooted to start in 2019 or 2020 with the backing from Tennis Australia, In the end, the ATP decided to launch the competition as the ATP Cup, a separate tournament to the World Team Cup, in 2020.

On 7 August 2022, Tennis Australia announced that the ATP Cup would be shut down, to be replaced by a mixed-gender United Cup from 2023.

Past finals

Titles by country

Point distribution

Fair Play Trophy
Presented since 1989, the Fair Play Trophy was awarded by an international jury of tennis journalists and the captains of the competing nations.

See also
 Davis Cup
 ATP Cup
 Fed Cup
 Hopman Cup

References

External links

 
Defunct tennis tournaments in Germany
Clay court tennis tournaments
ATP Tour
Sports competitions in Düsseldorf
May sporting events
Recurring sporting events established in 1975
Recurring sporting events disestablished in 2012
International men's tennis team competitions